Fitch Park is a baseball park complex and training facility located in Mesa, Arizona. It is the spring training workout facility for Major League Baseball's Oakland Athletics. It is also the year-round home for Oakland's minor league training and player development operations, the home ballpark of the Arizona League Athletics, and the spring training home for Oakland's minor league affiliates.

The Chicago Cubs used the baseball fields and training facility in the same capacities from 1997 to 2013.

The building's exterior and interior were remodeled to reflect Oakland's green and gold color scheme. The playing fields, pitcher's mounds, and batting cages were also improved to meet the team's needs.

References

Minor league baseball venues
Sports in Mesa, Arizona
Sports venues in Maricopa County, Arizona
1997 establishments in Arizona
Sports venues completed in 1997
Arizona Complex League ballparks